Stephanus Lombaard is a paralympic athlete from South Africa competing mainly in category F57 throwing events.

Stephanus was part of the South African team that travelled to the 1996 Summer Paralympics where he competed in all three throws in the F57 class winning gold in the shot put and javelin and silver in the discus.

References

Paralympic athletes of South Africa
Athletes (track and field) at the 1996 Summer Paralympics
Paralympic gold medalists for South Africa
Paralympic bronze medalists for South Africa
Living people
South African people of Dutch descent
Medalists at the 1996 Summer Paralympics
Recipients of the Order of Ikhamanga
Year of birth missing (living people)
Paralympic medalists in athletics (track and field)
South African male discus throwers
South African male javelin throwers
South African male shot putters
20th-century South African people
21st-century South African people
Wheelchair discus throwers
Wheelchair javelin throwers
Wheelchair shot putters
Paralympic discus throwers
Paralympic javelin throwers
Paralympic shot putters